Tammjärv is an Estonian surname. Notable people with the surname include:

Karel Tammjärv (born 1989), Estonian cross-country skier
Kärt Tammjärv (born 1991), Estonian actress

Estonian-language surnames